2 or  Erkin Koray 2 is the third studio album by Turkish rock musician Erkin Koray. Stylistically, this album leans more towards traditional Turkish music styles.

Track listing

References

1976 albums
Erkin Koray albums